The Church of Saint Mary the Ancient is a 12th-century church in  Valladolid, central Spain. It was declared Bien de Interés Cultural in 1897.

History

Under the current building foundations have been found remains of a Roman hypocaustum . The church was likely founded in 1095 by Count Pedro Ansúrez, although there are no remains of this original structure. The oldest parts of the current temple date to the late 12th century: the gallery in the northern side of the building and the tower, both in Romanesque style. The tower, one of the symbols of Valladolid, has four floors, the upper three featuring windows, and a pyramidal top.

The naves and sanctuary of the church were rebuilt in the 14th  century in  Gothic style, following the style of Burgos Cathedral. The church has three aisles, with  three polygonal apses and a transept. The nave and the aisles are rib vaulted.

Due to a poor design and construction and the increasing size of the parish population, the building underwent successive additions and reparations: in the mid-16th century,  architect Rodrigo Gil de Hontañón restored the collapsing building, adding buttresses and several windows.

Also  from this period date the high altar retablo, by Juan de Juni (1550-1562; now in the Valladolid Cathedral). Several Baroque altarpieces were executed for the church's interior  during the 17th  and 18th  centuries, hiding the original Gothic appearance.

In the early 20th century the building was extensively restored and rebuilt in order to show its original Romanesque-Gothic appearance, following the doctrines of the French architect Eugène Emmanuel Viollet-le-Duc.

Gallery

See also 

 List of Bien de Interés Cultural in the Province of Valladolid

References 

Roman Catholic churches in Valladolid
Bien de Interés Cultural landmarks in the Province of Valladolid
Gothic architecture in Castile and León
Romanesque architecture in Castile and León